Romeni Scott Bitsindou (born 11 May 1996) is a Congolese professional footballer who plays as a midfielder for Arbroath, on loan from Livingston. Born in Belgium, he represents the Republic of the Congo national team.

Club career
Born in Brussels, Belgium, Bitsindou played in R.S.C. Anderlecht youth and reserves teams since 2011. A defensive midfielder, he played in Anderlecht team at the 2014–15 UEFA Youth League. He left Anderlecht in summer 2016 and went on for trials at Olympique de Marseille where he stays for some time but fails to get a contract. He reappeared at the end of the year in Switzerland where he played with FC United Zürich in Swiss Promotion League, 3rd level, in seasons 2016–17 and first half of 2017–18. During the winter-break, after trials, he got contract with Serbian SuperLiga side FK Javor Ivanjica. However, after not managing to get through to the starting line-up and failing to debut in the league, joined with the fact that Javor ended relegated to the second level were lesser number of foreigners is permitted, Bitsindou accepted a loan back to Belgium to second-level side Lommel SK, debuting in the Belgian First Division B, on August 3, 2018, in a home game against Union Saint-Gilloise.

In summer 2020 he joined same-level club, Belgian, Lierse.

Bitsindou joined Scottish club Livingston during the summer of 2022. Livingston loaned him to Arbroath in September 2022.

International career
While at youth levels of Anderlecht he represented Belgium at U-15 level, however, due to its origins, in 2015 he accepted a call from Congo national U-20 side to play in the 2015 African U-20 Championship, making 2 appearances. He represented the senior Republic of the Congo national team in a friendly 1–0 win over Niger on 10 June 2021.

References

1996 births
Living people
Footballers from Brussels
Republic of the Congo footballers
Republic of the Congo international footballers
Republic of the Congo under-20 international footballers
Belgian footballers
Belgian people of Republic of the Congo descent
Belgian sportspeople of African descent
Black Belgian sportspeople
Association football midfielders
Expatriate footballers in Switzerland
FK Javor Ivanjica players
Expatriate footballers in Serbia
Lommel S.K. players
Lierse Kempenzonen players
Challenger Pro League players
Livingston F.C. players
Expatriate footballers in Scotland
Scottish Professional Football League players
Arbroath F.C. players